Little Valley is a village in Cattaraugus County, New York,  United States and as the county seat, is the location of the county fair (held in August in the fairgrounds north of the village). The village is in the northwest corner of the town of Little Valley, which is north of Salamanca. The village population was 1,084 at the 2020 census, out of a population of 1,740 within the entire town.

The village's name is a relative comparison of two tributaries (the other being the neighboring Great Valley) of the Allegheny River.

History 
Prior to 1868, the village of Ellicottville was the county seat, but the presence of a railroad line in Little Valley prompted a move. The village of Little Valley was incorporated in 1876. The railroad line shut down around 1990.

The Little Valley post office is the only village structure listed on the National Register of Historic Places. The building is one of the newer buildings in the town, constructed in 1941 as project of the Works Progress Administration. Several other buildings (such as the Civil War Memorial Building in 1911 and the former Little Valley Central School building in 1921, as well as many of the houses) are significantly older than the post office.

Ira Joe Fisher, a daytime television personality and weather reporter, spent most of his childhood in Little Valley.

Politics and government
The village is operated by a village board that consists of a mayor, a deputy mayor, and three trustees. All serve four-year terms, and most of the board is up for re-election in the same year, meaning that two to three years can pass without any village board seats up for election.

The mayor of Little Valley is Jim Bowen, an independent. Bowen upset Norman Marsh, the longtime incumbent Republican mayor, in an election in March 2019; Bowen's term as mayor runs through March 2023. The village board consists of a deputy mayor and three other trustees, all elected at-large.

Public services
Fire service is provided through a local volunteer fire department, in operation since 1888. As of 2016, ambulance services are typically outsourced. Police services are provided directly by the Cattaraugus County Sheriff's Office.

Little Valley offers its own municipal electric service, through an affiliation with National Grid (formerly Niagara Mohawk), as well as municipal water, sewer, and streets departments.

Geography
The village of Little Valley is located in the northwest part of the town of Little Valley at  (42.249555, -78.799775).

Little Valley Creek, a tributary of the Allegheny River, flows past the northeast side of the village. A smaller creek, Lees Hollow, flanks Little Valley Creek on the southern side of the village.  Another creek without a name flows through the middle of the Village.  Historical records and maps do not indicate a name for this creek.

State routes NY-242 and NY-353 converge at the village. County Routes 5 and 14 enter the village from the north.

Bus service is provided to the village by Coach USA (on its Jamestown to New York City line) and the Seneca Transit System (on its Buffalo to Highbanks line).

The Pat McGee Trail runs through Little Valley and has a major stop at a former rail depot (now a pavilion) in the village.

Demographics

As of the census of 2000, there were 1,130 people, 427 households, and 266 families residing in the village. The population density was 1,127.3 people per square mile (436.3/km2). There were 513 housing units at an average density of 511.8 per square mile (198.1/km2). The racial makeup of the village was 95.58% White, 1.86% Black or African American, 0.80% Native American, 0.09% from other races, and 1.68% from two or more races. Hispanic or Latino of any race were 1.77% of the population.

There were 427 households, out of which 32.3% had children under the age of 18 living with them, 43.8% were married couples living together, 13.1% had a female householder with no husband present, and 37.7% were non-families. 32.6% of all households were made up of individuals, and 18.0% had someone living alone who was 65 years of age or older. The average household size was 2.37 and the average family size was 2.99.

In the village, the age distribution of the population shows 25.0% under the age of 18, 9.6% from 18 to 24, 31.7% from 25 to 44, 18.5% from 45 to 64, and 15.1% who were 65 years of age or older. The median age was 36 years. For every 100 females, there were 110.8 males. For every 100 females age 18 and over, there were 107.1 males.

The median income for a household in the village was $28,750, and the median income for a family was $31,875. Males had a median income of $27,500 versus $20,962 for females. The per capita income for the village was $14,458. About 11.2% of families and 15.5% of the population were below the poverty line, including 18.7% of those under age 18 and 7.4% of those age 65 or over.

Culture

Local commerce

Little Valley's main attraction is the Cattaraugus County Fairgrounds, the site of the annual county fair each August, as well as an annual "Freedom Daze" Fourth of July motorsports festival, horse shows and other miscellaneous events.

In 2001 the Little Valley Area Chamber of Commerce was founded. They host events such "Cheers to Little Valley" and sponsor "Christmas on Main Street".

No national chain franchises operate in the village of Little Valley (one, a Dollar General, does operate just outside its bounds). Its storefront businesses as of 2018 include a convenience store (flagship of the regional Crosby's chain), hardware store (operating under the Do it Best brand), two taverns, a laundromat, a regional bank, a credit union, a Chrysler automobile dealership, an auto repair and collision shop, a Progressive insurance agency, two hair salons, and a boutique. The local grocery store, originally an A&P in the 1960s and locally operated as Brooks Market from 1972 to 2017, went out of business during the retail apocalypse in January 2018; it was replaced by a grocery/convenience store relocating from Salamanca later that year, which closed in August 2019.

Ellicottville Brewing Company operates a microbrewery in a Little Valley factory.

Media
One radio station, weather radio WWG32 (162.425), is licensed to the village. WWG32 is based in Cheektowaga. It has been off-air for an unknown length of time.

WGWE operated from 2010 to 2021, and intermittently in 2022, from a tower south of the village. Current plans are for the station to eventually move out of Little Valley.

Little Valley is part of the Buffalo television market. Due to the hilly terrain, strong rooftop directional antennae are required to receive over-the-air television since the digital transition in 2009. Breezeline is the local cable and high-speed Internet provider.

Historical business
The cutlery industry was a major driver of the village of Little Valley's early economy. Cattaraugus Cutlery Company was the last surviving knife manufacturer in the village; it remained there until closing its doors in 1963, with its factory remaining standing and vacant until its destruction in a 2015 fire. W. R. Case & Sons Cutlery Co. was spun off from Cattaraugus in 1905, and that company remains in business, now based in Bradford, Pennsylvania.

Three weekly newspapers have operated out of Little Valley; the first was the Cattaraugus Republican (founded 1867, originally based in Ellicottville, but later acquired by the Salamanca Press), the second was The Little Valley Hub (operated from 1881 to 1968), and the most recent was the County Chronicle, which printed from 1992 to 2007, with some of the earlier years being based in Salamanca.

The Crosby's convenience store chain was founded in Little Valley in 1966, where its first store opened. The store was sold to a Lockport-based company in 2006, which used the Crosby's name for all of its stores after the purchase. Crosby's continues to have a store in Little Valley; its original location, a Quonset hut, has since been decommissioned.

Bush Industries operated a factory in the village until it closed in 2007.

Pirshlo, Inc., a regional franchisee of Uni-Marts and a proprietor of several other businesses (including the Chronicle), operated in the village from the late 1990s to 2007, when Pirshlo's owner, Lloyd Long, was arrested and later convicted of tax evasion in a dispute with the Seneca Nation of Indians.

Religion
Four churches operate within the village bounds: local branches of the United Methodist Church and Wesleyan Church, a congregational church, and a King James Only fundamentalist church. The village is also served by various churches surrounding the village in the towns of Little Valley and Mansfield.

The local Catholic Church, St. Mary's, closed in the late 2000s as part of the church's overall U.S. downsizing effort, and all of its congregation was directed to the identically named St. Mary's Roman Catholic Church in Cattaraugus. The Lutherans also had a church in the village that was closed shortly after the closure of St. Mary's.

Education
Public school students attend Cattaraugus-Little Valley Central School in Cattaraugus. Little Valley Central School operated in the village until 2000, shortly after voters approved a merger with Cattaraugus Central School. The district continued to operate an elementary school in the village until 2012 when it was controversially closed. The former school building is currently used by the county for offices it cannot accommodate at the county center; the former school's alumni association maintains a small museum in one of the rooms.

Grace Christian Academy operates a small private Christian school in the village.

Sports and recreation
Little Valley features teams in Little League Baseball and softball, as well as youth soccer. The Valley Thunder baseball club represented the village in Town Team Baseball in 2014, playing its games in Cattaraugus due to the lack of a regulation field in the village or town of Little Valley. The Thunder folded in 2015; that year and the next, a slow-pitch softball team represented the village in a local league also based in Cattaraugus.

The village supported the Little Valley Panthers youth football squad. Through 2014, the team played and practiced in Little Valley; in 2015, it was forced to move its games to Cattaraugus, and in 2016, the team was merged with Cattaraugus's.

The village has three public parks: a small unnamed park in the center of the village, Bicentennial Park on the village's west side adjacent to the County Center, and Eric Peters Memorial Park on the east side of the village. Memorial Park encompasses a public swimming pool, a walking trail, beach volleyball court and Little League Baseball diamond. The Lyle Underwood Memorial facility includes a weight room and, when weather permits, an ice skating pond.

References

External links
 Village of Little Valley official website
 Little Valley Area Chamber of Commerce
 Little Valley on Facebook

 Villages in New York (state)
 County seats in New York (state)
 Villages in Cattaraugus County, New York